CIMN-FM was a Canadian campus radio station at the University of Prince Edward Island in Charlottetown, Prince Edward Island.

The station began as a "very low power broadcast station", known as Radio UPEI and operated from the top floor of the administrative building in 1970. The transmitters were home-made and of solid state design. In 1972, the UPEI Student Union funded upgrades to a carrier current system operating on 700 kHz using the callsign CSUR. This conflicted with international callsign allocations (the ITU prefix CS is assigned to Portugal, not Canada), so a new application was made for the callsign CIMN (Campus Information Music & News).

A series of transmitters, using the electrical wiring of buildings as the antenna system, were located in the various residences. A set of control rooms and production studios located on the 4th floor of Main Building remained in operation for a number of years. At that time, the station had a station manager, and a news director, paid for by the Student Union.  The station also began to simulcast audio via the local cable television system into homes in the area.

In 1982, the studios were moved to the Barn, which housed student union offices and student activity areas on campus.

The station received a full FM license in 1995 to broadcast at 90.3 FM, and at this point, legal problems began. CIMN became the first Canadian station without a full-time staff person to be granted a broadcast licence by the Canadian Radio-television and Telecommunications Commission (CRTC).

The licence expired in August 2000 and was not renewed.

References

External links
 

Imn
Imn
University of Prince Edward Island
Radio stations established in 1970
1970 establishments in Prince Edward Island
Radio stations disestablished in 2000
2000 disestablishments in Prince Edward Island
IMM-FM